Chahar Right Middle Banner (Цахар баруун гарын дундад хошуу; Čaqar Baraɣun Ɣarun Dumdadu qosiɣu) is a banner (county equivalent) of Inner Mongolia, People's Republic of China, bordered by Chahar Right Back Banner to the east, Zhuozi County to the south, and Siziwang Banner to the northwest. It is under the administration of Ulaan Chab City.

Climate

References

www.xzqh.org 

Banners of Inner Mongolia
Ulanqab